Kotagiri is the oldest  hill stations in the Nilgiris. Looming over and above all the surrounding hills in the North-eastern escarpments, its climate is claimed to be one of the best in the World. Kotagiri literally means the lines of the house of the Unlike Ooty . At an elevation of 1950 m. Kotagiri is quietly tucked away in the Nilgiris and used to be the summer resort of the British. Kotagiri or Kothagiri is a taluk and a Panchayat town in The Nilgiris District in the Indian state of Tamil Nadu. It is the third largest hill station in the Nilgiri hills.The Nilgiri hills has been the traditional home of the "Kota" tribes. The name ‘Kota-giri’ itself means ‘mountain of the Kotas’.Kotagiri was known in the past as “Kota-Keri” or “Kota-gherry” the street of Kotas”.The town has developed around numerous knolls and valleys. The Kotagiri weather is more bracing than that of Coonoor and balmier than that of Ooty.

Demographics
 India census, Kotagiri town Panchayat has population of 28,207 of which 13,607 are males while 14,600 are females Population of Children aged 0–6 is 2,340 which is 8.30% of total population of Kotagiri (TP). In Kotagiri Town Panchayat, Female Sex Ratio is 1073 against state average of 996. Child Sex Ratio in Kotagiri is 945 compared to Tamil Nadu state average of 943. Literacy rate of Kotagiri city is 86.79% higher than state average of 80.09%. In Kotagiri, Male literacy is around 93.55% while female literacy rate is 80.57%.

Villages in Kotagiri Town Panchayat

Educational institutions

 St. Jude's Public School & Junior College

Tourist spots
 Kodanad View Point
 Catherine Falls
 Elk Falls
 Longwood Chola
 Rangaswamy Peak And Pillar
 John Sullivan Memorial

References

External links

 http://nilgiris.nic.in/
 https://nilgirisecotourism.com/

Hill stations in Tamil Nadu
Cities and towns in Nilgiris district